Cynghordy railway station serves the rural community of Cynghordy near Llandovery, Carmarthenshire, Wales.

After departing this station heading northbound, the train crosses the Cynghordy Viaduct where panoramic views of the surrounding countryside can be seen. The viaduct is visible, using good binoculars, from the highest Black Mountain ridges.

Facilities
The station had no facilities whatsoever for many years but a shelter has recently been provided along with a customer help point and CIS screen.

Services
All trains serving the station are operated by Transport for Wales (who also manage it). There are four trains a day in each direction (towards Swansea and ) from Monday to Saturday, and two services on Sundays. This is a request stop, whereby passengers have to give a hand signal to the approaching train driver to board or notify the guard when they board that they wish to alight from the train there.

References

Further reading

External links 

Railway stations in Carmarthenshire
DfT Category F2 stations
Former London and North Western Railway stations
Railway stations in Great Britain opened in 1868
Railway stations in Great Britain closed in 1949
Railway stations in Great Britain opened in 1950
Heart of Wales Line
Railway stations served by Transport for Wales Rail
Railway request stops in Great Britain